Amazing Grace is an 83' topsail schooner. Its home port is in San Juan, Puerto Rico. The ship serves as the platform for the non-profit Maritime Leadership and is also available for private charters and memorials at sea. Maritime Leadership provides traditional sail training adventures through sailings ranging from 3–48 hours.

History 
Like other schooners, Amazing Grace is the traditional American sailing craft. These were the small vessels that fought the British in the War of Independence and again in the War of 1812, both as ships of the U.S. Navy and as privateers.

The original name was Tuolumne, named after a river in Yosemite National Park. The ship was designed by Don McQuiston with engineering by Don Patterson, NA, and was built on the Steven's Ranch, a cattle operation east of Del Mar, California by Don McQuiston and his son Donnie. Upon completion it was hauled to The Knight & Carver Boatyard on San Diego's Mission Bay and launched on October 25, 1989.

The nine spars were shaped from old growth Douglas fir shipped from a mill in Washington State. The ship was originally rigged as a brigantine carrying three yards on the foremast. The bowsprit, jib boom, and dolphin striker which carry three sails; the mainmast is gaff rigged with mainsail and gaff topsail; between the masts is the main staysail and fisherman. Seventeen months later the ship went for a first sail in 20 knot winds off San Diego. In 1994, with a crew of six, the ship sailed north for Bellingham, WA, and then cruised the San Juan Islands, participated in Tall Ships events, raced with schooners up the British Columbia coast and one trip to Alaska.

References

External links 
 East Island Excursions, Inc.

Tourist attractions in San Juan, Puerto Rico
Schooners of the United States
1991 ships
Baltimore Clipper
Sail training ships
Ships built in California
Transportation in San Juan, Puerto Rico
Sailing in Puerto Rico